Rapala iarbus, the common red flash, is a species of lycaenid butterfly found in South. and Southeast Asia.

It is a small sized butterfly with a wingspan of 3.3 to 4.1 cms. It is found across India except in the arid regions of Northwest and Northeast.

References

Fauna of Pakistan
Butterflies of Asia
Rapala (butterfly)
Butterflies of Singapore
Taxa named by Johan Christian Fabricius
Butterflies described in 1787